Charles Leslie Roberts (28 May 1901 – 29 May 1980), sometimes known as Charles Roberts, was an English professional footballer who made over 300 appearances as an inside forward in the Football League. He is best remembered for his three years with Swindon Town, for whom he made 119 appearances and scored 35 goals.

Career statistics

References

1901 births
English footballers
English Football League players
Brentford F.C. players
1980 deaths
People from Halesowen
Association football inside forwards
Aston Villa F.C. players
Redditch United F.C. players
Members of the Order of the British Empire
Chesterfield F.C. players
Sheffield Wednesday F.C. players
Merthyr Town F.C. players
AFC Bournemouth players
Bolton Wanderers F.C. players
Swindon Town F.C. players
Manchester City F.C. players
Exeter City F.C. players
Crystal Palace F.C. players
Chester City F.C. players
Scunthorpe United F.C. players
New Brighton A.F.C. players
Midland Football League players
Bristol Rovers F.C. players
Rotherham United F.C. players
South Liverpool F.C. players